Sports Channel (Arutz HaSport), also known as the Sport 5 (Sport Hamesh) is one of the major Israeli television company and sports journalism outlet owned by the RGE Group. Available on cable (via HOT) and satellite (via yes), the company has six channels which are devoted to sport.

Main and Subsidiary channels

5SPORT
In 1990, the channel first aired as the Sports Channel in channel 5, from whence its name is derived.

5PLUS
In 2001, the subscription fee based channel 5PLUS was created as Sport 5's first subsidiary channel with content such as (cut down international versions of) WWE Raw and WWE Friday Night SmackDown. Since then, 5SPORT has lost almost all of its notable content, though it is still used to show UEFA Champions League matches in tandem with 5PLUS channel.

5LIVE and 5GOLD
In March 2007, the company launched two new channels, 5LIVE (for live sport) and 5GOLD (repeats of classic sports action). The new channels were met with great criticism from viewers complaining about even more loss of content in favor of pay channels.

5SPORT HD
On December 23, 2007, Sports Channel launched a Fifth channel – 5SPORT HD. The channel, aired UEFA Champions League, the NBA Playoff games and Wimbledon tournament.

In addition to current content, the channel also broadcast games from the 2008 Summer Olympics and 2012 Summer Olympics. Also, it was announced that starting next season the channel will introduce formula 1 racing. 5SPORT HD is available for both yes HD and HOT HD customers.

5SPORT 3D
In April 2011, Sports Channel launched their sixth channel – 5SPORT 3D. The channel broadcast matches in 3D.
In September 2011, the channel was shut down due to low demand and was defined as a channel that was ahead of its time.

5STARS

5SPORT 4K
Sports Channel launched their eighth channel – 5SPORT 4K. The channel broadcast matches in 4K.

5EURO2024
Sports Channel launched their temporary channel – 5EURO2024. The channel who devoted to the screening of UEFA Euro 2024.

Broadcasting rights
The company broadcast some games (only few in each)
  Israeli Premier League (games 1, 6 and 7)
  Davis Cup
  Fed Cup
  Formula One
  Wimbledon
  Euroleague Basketball
  UEFA Euro 2024 (all matches live including Israel live matches if at least an Israeli team is involved)
  UEFA Champions League
 UEFA Youth League
 UEFA Futsal Champions League (final four only)
  Israeli Basketball Super League
  Israeli Basketball League Cup
  Israeli Handball Super League
  Israeli Volleyball Super League
  Liga Leumit
  Liga Leumit Basketball League
  Israeli Noar Leumit League
  Toto Cup
  Ekstraklasa
  Ligue 1
 J-League
  A-League
  MLB
  NBA
  NFL
  NHL
  The Olympic Games

References

Bigraohyfan.top

External links

 

Sports television in Israel
Television channels and stations established in 1990
1990 establishments in Israel
3D television channels